Mohammad Hosseini may refer to:

 Mohammad Hosseini (footballer, born 1979), Iranian football player
 Mohammad Hosseini (footballer, born 1995) (born 1995), Iranian football 
 Mohammad Hosseini (politician) (born 1961), Iranian politician
 Mohammad Hosseini (1983–2023), Iranian protester who was executed by the government of Iran
 Mohammad-Ali Hosseini, Iranian politician
 Mohammad Hassan Hosseini (1984–2016), Afghan Shia commander of the Fatemiyoun Brigade
 Mohammad Reza Hosseini (born 1989), Iranian footballer